John Augustus Kelly Jr. (September 16, 1927 – November 7, 1992), known professionally as Jack Kelly, was an American film and television actor most noted for the role of Bart Maverick in the television series Maverick, which ran on ABC from 1957 to 1962.

Kelly shared the series, rotating as the lead from week to week, first with James Garner as Bret Maverick (1957–1960) then with Roger Moore as Beau Maverick (1960–1961) and Robert Colbert as Brent Maverick (1961, for two episodes), before becoming the only Maverick (alternating with reruns from the Garner era) in the fifth season.

Kelly later became a politician, having served from 1983 to 1986 as the mayor of Huntington Beach, California.

Early life
John Augustus Kelly Jr. was born in Astoria, Queens, New York, one of four children, to Ann Mary (née Walsh) and John Augustus Kelly Sr.  "Jackie", as he was called as a child, came from a prominent theatrical family. His mother, Ann "Nan" Kelly, had been a popular stage actress and John Robert Powers  model. Kelly Senior was a theater ticket broker, and after he moved the family to Hollywood, entered the real estate business.

His sister, Oscar-nominated actress Nancy Kelly, was a prominent leading lady opposite Spencer Tracy, Tyrone Power, and Henry Fonda among many others across a 36-film span. His other two siblings, Carole and William Clement, also tried show business. Kelly served in the United States Army Air Corps during World War II.

Career

Early roles
Kelly made his film debut in an uncredited role in the 1939 biopic The Story of Alexander Graham Bell, opposite Don Ameche and Loretta Young. In early 1954, he appeared in the film noir Drive a Crooked Road, written by Blake Edwards and Richard Quine and starring Mickey Rooney. On July 15, 1954, Kelly played the gunfighter, cattleman, and bandit Clay Allison in the syndicated television series Stories of the Century, starring and narrated by Jim Davis.

In 1955-1956 television season, Kelly starred in a series based on the 1942 feature film Kings Row starring Ann Sheridan and Ronald Reagan. He played Dr. Parris Mitchell, a young psychiatrist coping with the narrow-minded environment of his small town while Robert Horton played the part originally performed by Reagan in the theatrical film. King's Row was one-third of the Warner Bros. Presents wheel series, hosted by Gig Young. It rotated at the scheduled hour of 7:30 Eastern on Tuesday with a similar television version of the popular movie Casablanca as well as the new ABC Western series Cheyenne starring Clint Walker. After the series ended in 1956, Kelly appeared in Forbidden Planet (1956) and She Devil (1957), along with guest roles on Fireside Theater, Schlitz Playhouse of Stars, Lux Video Theatre, and Gunsmoke.

Maverick (1957–1962)

The various anti-heroic Mavericks were dapper professional poker-players roaming the Old West with the benefit of superb scripts (at least in the first two seasons; the show gradually declined during the last three seasons).  The series had an enormous cultural impact during a time when there were only three television networks and most American cities had only three TV channels to choose from.

Maverick'''s demanding filming schedule had caused production to lag behind early on. The producers decided to give Bret Maverick (James Garner) a brother so as not to run out of episodes long before the end of the season. Thus, Kelly was introduced as Bart Maverick in "Hostage," the eighth episode of the series.

Kelly shared the lead with James Garner in one of the show's most-discussed episodes, "Shady Deal at Sunny Acres", on which the first half of the 1973 movie The Sting appears to be based. The pair also co-starred in the famous "Pappy" episode in which Garner played the brothers' much-quoted father Beauregard "Pappy" Maverick, in addition to his regular role of Bret. Aided by trick photography, Bret and Pappy play cards together in one scene (Kelly had a dual role in the episode as well, playing Bart and elderly Uncle Bentley "Bent" Maverick). Bart rescued Bret at the climax of "Duel at Sundown", in which Garner fought guest star Clint Eastwood.

Garner had first choice of which part he would play in the two-brother episodes, which delineated the brothers as "Maverick 1" and "Maverick 2" in the scripts, giving him an enormous advantage. All but one script during the show's first two years were written with Garner in mind regardless of which actor would eventually be cast. Series creator Roy Huggins insisted that the writers visualize Garner as Maverick while writing the scripts, according to his Archive of American Television interview. The second season episode in which Maverick was written with Kelly in mind instead of Garner was titled "Passage to Fort Doom."

Although the "solo" episodes in which Bart appeared tended to be somewhat more dramatic than the often more humorous Bret episodes, Kelly displayed his comedic skills in lighter Maverick outings such as "Hadley's Hunters" and "The People's Friend." Kelly actually appeared in more episodes of Maverick than James Garner, who left the show following a contract dispute in 1960 to successfully accelerate his theatrical film career. Kelly appeared in approximately 75 episodes due to his remaining for the entire run of the series; Garner is in 52 episodes altogether not counting introducing Kelly's earlier solo episodes in a separate frontispiece to ease audiences into the presence of a second Maverick during much of the first season.

In the wake of Garner's departure, Roger Moore stepped in to play Bart's cousin Beau Maverick in fourteen episodes, sharing the screen with Kelly in three of them, while Garner look-alike Robert Colbert appeared in two installments as a third brother wearing Bret's costume and named Brent, one of which briefly featured Kelly.  The series was abruptly canceled after the fifth season, which consisted of Kelly appearing as the only Maverick in new episodes alternating with reruns of Garner shows from earlier seasons.  The billing at the beginning of the show was reversed in the fifth season, with Kelly being billed above Garner.  Kelly maintained that he was never notified of the cancellation by the studio but instead wound up learning about it in a newspaper article.

Later career
When Maverick ended in 1962, Kelly continued acting with roles in a number of films and television shows. In 1962, he played the lead in Red Nightmare (also known as The Commies Are Coming, the Commies Are Coming in its derisive 1985 video re-release incarnation) a Cold War film narrated by Jack Webb in which Kelly's character wakes up one morning to discover that America has been taken over by Communists. 

On December 30, 1963, Kelly appeared in "The Fenton Canaby Story" on ABC's Wagon Train. Canaby, played by Kelly, is a former trailmaster with a dark secret he refuses to discuss. He is attracted to Lucy Garrison, a young woman with her own questionable past portrayed by Barbara Bain, long before Bain's subsequent series Mission: Impossible!.

Kelly co-starred in Commandos (1968) opposite Lee Van Cleef, and as a villain dressed quite similarly to Bart Maverick who beats Angie Dickinson with his belt in his hotel room in Young Billy Young (1969) starring Robert Mitchum. From 1969 to 1971, Kelly hosted the NBC daytime game show Sale of the Century but was eventually replaced by Joe Garagiola. He was also briefly a series regular in Get Christie Love! (1974) and The Hardy Boys/Nancy Drew Mysteries (1978), and performed many lucrative television commercial voice-overs.

In 1977 Kelly appeared as obstreperous villains for a few moments in two episodes of James Garner's series Rockford Files. The first appearance was in the season 3 episode, "The Becker Connection," and the second was the first show of season 4, "Beamer's Last Case" as a jealous husband. In 1978, he briefly appeared as Bart Maverick and was again paired with Garner in the TV-movie The New Maverick and in Garner's TV series Bret Maverick (1981; Kelly appeared momentarily at the end of the final episode of the show and would have become a regular had it been renewed). He showed up on a 1983 episode of The Fall Guy, costumed as Bart Maverick but playing himself in a storyline that rounded up many classic TV cowboys. In 1991, he reprised the role of Bart Maverick one last time in the Kenny Rogers vehicle, The Gambler Returns: The Luck of the Draw. Kelly died the following year.

Business and politics
Kelly's acting roles became less frequent in the late 1970s as he became more involved in real estate and local politics.  He started buying real estate in Huntington Beach in the mid-1960s and moved there permanently in 1971.

He formed August II, Inc., to hold the real estate assets in June 1965 in Huntington Beach.

His wife, Jo, became a real estate broker and did much of the business management of the real estate business, especially while Kelly was involved with Huntington Beach city government.

During the 1980s and early 1990s he served as Huntington Beach city councilman and mayor, campaigning with the slogan "Let Maverick Solve Your Problems."

Personal life and death

Kelly married actress May Wynn (real name: Donna Lee Hickey) on October 14, 1956. They separated in February 1964 and were divorced on October 19, 1964. She stated in court that they had been arguing a lot the last two years and he started staying out all night.

Following the divorce he later dated Karen Steele for a short time.

He married Jo Ann Smith in Las Vegas, Nevada on October 16, 1969.  The following November their daughter Nicole was born.  Nicole is the founder of and executive producer at August II Productions.

On April 28, 1992, Kelly suffered a heart attack.   A little over six months later he died of a stroke at Humana Hospital in Huntington Beach, California, on November 7, 1992. He was 65 years old. 

Jo Kelly became an "extra" in film and television productions, helped others learn the business, and wrote a book about it, The Truth about Being an Extra'' (2006).

A Republican, Jack Kelly supported Dwight Eisenhower during the 1952 presidential election.

Filmography

References

Further reading

External links

Roy Huggins' Archive of American Television Interview

1927 births
1992 deaths
20th-century American male actors
American actor-politicians
American game show hosts
American male film actors
American male television actors
California Republicans
Male actors from New York (state)
Male Western (genre) film actors
Mayors of Huntington Beach, California
Military personnel from New York City
People from Queens, New York
People from Greater Los Angeles
Warner Bros. contract players
20th-century American politicians
Western (genre) television actors